Itamar, also transcribed to English as Etamar, Isamar or Ithamar, is a Hebrew male given name. It originated with Ithamar, named in the Old Testament of the Bible (the Torah) as the youngest son of Aaron. 

It is common to interpret the name Itamar (אִיתָמָר) as a compound of two Hebrew words: "אִי" (í) means "island" and "תָמָר" (tamár) means "date palm". So Itamar would literally mean "Date Island".

However, the name is probably from Aramaic; "itmar" in aramaic means "saying" (both as a verb and as a noun), and "itamar" is a past form of this word that means "it was said" or "it is told". This original meaning is preserved in the Talmud.

Itamar may refer to:

People
Ithamar, Bishop of Rochester (7th century), English bishop
Itamar Assumpção (1949–2003), Brazilian songwriter and composer
Itamar Batista da Silva (born 1980), Brazilian football player
Itamar Ben-Avi (1882–1943), Israeli journalist and pioneer of modern Hebrew
Ithamar Ben-Canaan (born 1976), Israeli writer
Itamar Ben-Gvir (born 1976), Israeli politician
Itamar Biran (born 1998), Israeli alpine ski racer
Itamar Even-Zohar (born 1939) Israeli sociologist and linguist
Itamar Franco (1930–2011), Brazilian politician and President
Issamar Ginzberg (born 1980), Israeli business consultant and journalist
Ithamara Koorax (born 1965), Brazilian singer
Itamar Marcus (born 1953), Israeli writer and political activist
Itamar Marzel (born 1949), Israeli basketball player
Itamar Moses (born 1977), American writer
Itamar Nitzan (born 1987), Israeli football player
Itamar Rabinovich (born 1942), Israeli historian, diplomat and president of Tel Aviv University
Ithamar Romanos (born 1999), Lebanese female footballer
Isamar Rosenbaum (1886–1973), Nadvorna Rebbe
Itamar Rosensweig, American rabbi
Itamar Schülle (born 1967), Brazilian football manager
Itamar Shimoni (born 1968), Israeli politician
Itamar Simonson (born 1951) Professor of marketing at Stanford University
Itamar Singer (1946–2012), Israeli historian
Ithamar Sloan (1822–1898), American politician and lawyer

See also
Itamar, small town in Israel
Itamar attack (2002)
Itamar attack (2011)

References 

Given names of Hebrew language origin